Skovbjerg is a Danish surname. Notable people with the surname include:

 John Skovbjerg (born 1956), Danish marathon runner
 Thomas Skovbjerg (born 1974), Danish footballer

See also
 Skovbjerg, a forest in the Mols Bjerge National Park

Danish-language surnames